Krigia wrightii, known as Wright's dwarfdandelion, is a North American species of plants in the family Asteraceae. It is native to the southern Great Plains of the south-central United States (Arkansas, Oklahoma, Texas, Louisiana).

Krigia wrightii is a small annual rarely more than 25  cm (10 inches) tall, with a taproot. The plant produces only one flower hear per flower stalk, each head with 5–25 yellow ray flowers but no disc flowers.

References

Cichorieae
Flora of the Great Plains (North America)
Endemic flora of the United States
Flora of Louisiana
Plants described in 1844
Taxa named by Asa Gray
Flora without expected TNC conservation status